Khairul Asyraf bin Sahizah (born 8 March 1994) is a Malaysian footballer who plays as a forward for Perak.

References

External links
 

1994 births
Living people
People from Perak
Malaysian footballers
Malaysia Super League players
Perak F.C. players
PKNP FC players
UiTM FC players
Association football forwards
Malaysian people of Malay descent